Dolly Style is a Swedish girl group. The group was created by Emma Nors and Palle Hammarlund and features three girls that call themselves Molly, Holly and Polly. The trio claims to originate from a "dollhouse in Dollyville". The group is inspired by the kawaii aesthetic from Japanese subcultures, such as fairy kei, gyaru and lolita. The group has participated in Melodifestivalen three times: in 2015 with "Hello Hi", in 2016 with "Rollercoaster", and most recently in 2019 with "Habibi".

Career

2014–15: Debut with "Hello Hi", Melodifestivalen and line-up changes
Dolly Style was formed in the summer of 2014 by Emma Nors and Palle Hammarlund under Capitol Records Sweden. Their debut was first announced in late 2014 and was confirmed to make their debut in Melodifestivalen in February 2015 with "Hello Hi". The group participated in Melodifestivalen 2015 with the song "Hello Hi", in the first semifinal. The group made it to the second chance round but failed to advance to the final. "Hello Hi" charted at number 32 in Sweden.

In April 2015, it was announced that Emma Pucek, the first "Polly" had left the group, and that she had been replaced with another person, Marielle Myhrberg, who would take on the "Polly" persona.

On May 1, Dolly Style uploaded a preview from a performance of a new song called "Upsy Daisy", a release date has not been announced yet for this song, however, on May 4, Dolly Style revealed the cover art for their second single called "Cherry Gum" and announced the release date for May 8. They also announced that "Cherry Gum" would be released internationally. Dolly Style's third single, "Upsy Daisy", was released on September 10. On November 5, it was announced that Carolina Magnell, better known by her Dolly Style persona Molly, had left Dolly Style due to personal reasons. Emma Nors, their manager, had announced that they would be looking for a new Molly for Dolly Style. On November 17, the new singer for the "Molly" persona, Mikaela, was revealed.

2015–present: Melodifestivalen, singles and departures 
In November 2015, it was revealed that Dolly Style would participate again in Melodifestivalen 2016 with a new single, "Rollercoaster". Like last time, they made it to the second chance round of Melodifestivalen. "Rollercoaster", their fourth single, was Dolly Style's highest charting single to date, peaking at No.27 in Sweden. In June 2017, Dolly Style released their fifth single "Unicorns & Ice Cream", with the music video for it later coming out in August.

In August 2016, Marielle Myhrberg announced that she would be leaving Dolly Style. On September 12, the new Polly (Sarah von Reis) presented herself on Facebook and Instagram. She promised to answer questions in the near future, and she also announced that the group was recording a new single. In October 2016, they released "Young and Restless", their sixth single. The music video was released over one month later.

Dolly Style participated in Melodifestivalen 2019 with the song "Habibi", but failed to advance from the third heat, finishing in fifth place.

In June 2019, Mikaela Samuelsson, who played Molly, announced that after four years she was leaving the group.

Documentary
On February 17, 2019, the day after Dolly Style participated in Melodifestivalen 2019, SVT released the first of three episodes in the short documentary Dolly Style-fabriken ("Dolly Style factory") that showed how Emma Nors and Palle Hammarlund originally formed the group and business model, as well as their desire to export the concept to other countries. The documentary featured criticism against Dolly Style's creators. Emma Nors said that the documentary, by only interviewing earlier members and not newer members, was demonizing and biased. The documentary creators said that they invited Emma Nors to take part in additional interviews to respond to the criticism. They argued also that they tried to interview newer members.

The documentary's other episodes claimed that earlier member Sarah von Reis' departure from the group was not voluntary, and that Emma Nors had kicked her out of the group. Reis also said that she did not write the farewell message that was posted on Instagram in connection with her departure.

The ending of the documentary was done hastily, as its creators wanted to release the first episode in time for Melodifestivalen 2019.

Member timeline

Discography

EPs

Singles

External links
Dolly Style biography, news, discography at Bubblegum Dancer

References

Swedish musical trios
Swedish Eurodance groups
Swedish dance music groups
Swedish pop music groups
Swedish girl groups
Swedish electronic music groups
Europop groups
Nu-disco musicians
Musical groups established in 2014
Melodifestivalen contestants of 2019
Melodifestivalen contestants of 2016
Melodifestivalen contestants of 2015